Perfedd was a hundred, a geographic division, in the traditional county of Carmarthenshire, Wales. Its name derives from the Latin word permedium meaning "inner part".

Hundreds of Carmarthenshire